Palpita candidalis is a moth in the family Crambidae. It was described by Paul Dognin in 1904. It is found in Ecuador.

References

Moths described in 1904
Palpita
Moths of South America